Alan Raymond Jinkinson (27 February 1935 – 6 November 2022) was a British trade union leader.

Jinkinson was born in Sheffield, Yorkshire on 27 February 1935, and was educated at King Edward VII School in the city.  After national service in the Royal Signals, he took a place at Keble College, Oxford, gaining a degree in history, and then became, first, an accountant, and then a teacher, before joining the public service trade union NALGO (National and Local Government Officers' Association) in its education department in 1960.

Jinkinson stood for the Labour Party in the 1962 Orpington by-election.  A supporter of Hugh Gaitskell, he attacked Eric Lubbock, the Liberal Party candidate for supporting unilateral nuclear disarmament.  However, Lubbock won the seat, while Jinkinson took third place with 12.4% of the vote, losing his deposit.  Jinkinson also stood for Labour at Hendon North in the 1964 general election, losing but reducing the Conservative majority.

He became deputy general secretary of NALGO in 1981, and succeeded John Daly as general secretary in 1990, helping to oversee the union's merger with NUPE and COHSE in 1993 to form Unison. He remained general secretary of Unison before retiring in 1996.

Jinkinson died on 6 November 2022, at the age of 87.

References

1935 births
2022 deaths
British trade union leaders
General Secretaries of NALGO
General Secretaries of Unison (trade union)
People educated at King Edward VII School, Sheffield
Members of the General Council of the Trades Union Congress
Labour Party (UK) parliamentary candidates